Robert Bigsby  (11 April 1806 – 27 September 1873) was an English antiquarian and author.

Bigsby was born in Castle Gate, Nottingham in 1806, son of Robert Bigsby, the registrar of the archdeaconry of Nottingham.
His father had visited the United States in 1787 where he had often been the guest of George Washington.
He was educated at Repton School during the headmastership of William Boultbee Sleath, and originally intended to become a lawyer. However, he turned to the study of antiquities and in particular to collecting memorabilia of Sir Francis Drake, the famous navigator of the Elizabethan era. He had inherited Drake's astrolabe, and in 1831 he presented the instrument to King William IV, who in turn presented it to Greenwich Hospital.
He presented other relics of Drake to the British Museum.

Bigsby was awarded an honorary LLD by the University of Glasgow, became a member of several foreign literary societies, was voted a Fellow of the Society of Antiquaries and in 1837 a Fellow of the Royal Society (although ejected in 1845 for non-payment) and became secretary and registrar of the English "Langue" of the Knights Hospitaller. He was a prolific author, writing poetry and drama but mainly concentrating on antiquarian subjects, publishing sixteen books and many articles in magazines and reviews.

Bigsby was elected a member of the American Antiquarian Society in 1851.

He died on 27 September 1873 at Peckham Rye, aged 67.

Bibliography

References

1806 births
1873 deaths
People from Nottingham
English antiquarians
Fellows of the Royal Society
Fellows of the Society of Antiquaries of London
People educated at Repton School
Members of the American Antiquarian Society